Pňovany is a municipality and village in Plzeň-North District in the Plzeň Region of the Czech Republic. It has about 400 inhabitants.

Administrative parts
Villages of Chotěšovičky and Rájov are administrative parts of Pňovany.

References

Villages in Plzeň-North District